Tajabad is a former name of Herat, Iran, a city in Yazd Province, Iran.

Tajabad may also refer to:

Fars Province
 Tajabad, Marvdasht, a village in Marvdasht County
 Tajabad, Zarrin Dasht, a village in Zarrin Dasht County

Hamadan Province
 Tajabad-e Olya, Hamadan, Hamadan Province
 Tajabad-e Sofla, Hamadan, Hamadan Province

Isfahan Province
 Tajabad, Natanz, a village in Natanz County

Kerman Province
 Tajabad, Anbarabad, Kerman Province
 Tajabad, Baft, Kerman Province
 Tajabad, Bardsir, Kerman Province
 Tajabad-e Yek, Bardsir, Bardsir County, Kerman Province
 Tajabad, Jiroft, Kerman Province
 Tajabad, Kahnuj, Kerman Province
 Tajabad-e Do, Kahnuj, Kahnuj County, Kerman Province
 Tajabad, Derakhtengan, Kerman County, Kerman Province
 Tajabad, Narmashir, Kerman Province
 Tajabad, Rafsanjan, Kerman Province
 Tajabad-e Kohneh, Rafsanjan County, Kerman Province
 Tajabad-e Olya, Rudbar-e Jonubi County, Kerman Province
 Tajabad, Zarand, Kerman Province

Kurdistan Province
 Tajabad, Divandarreh, Kurdistan Province
 Tajabad, Qorveh, Kurdistan Province

Razavi Khorasan Province
 Tajabad, Razavi Khorasan

Sistan and Baluchestan Province
 Tajabad, Sistan and Baluchestan

South Khorasan Province
 Tajabad, Tabas, South Khorasan Province